Borley Point is the northwest tip of Montagu Island in the South Sandwich Islands. It was charted in 1930 by DI personnel on the Discovery II and named for John Oliver Borley, a member of the Discovery Committee.

See also
Longlow Rock, located 1 nautical mile (2 km) south-southwest of Borley Point

References

External links
 

Headlands of South Georgia and the South Sandwich Islands